Eddy Col is a steep-sided rocky col between Mount Taylor and Blade Ridge,  southwest of the head of Hope Bay on Trinity Peninsula. It was surveyed in 1955 by the Falkland Islands Dependencies Survey, who applied the descriptive name; the wind direction varies continually in this col.

References 

Mountain passes of Trinity Peninsula